Soul is the sixth studio album by British singer Seal, which was released on 10 November 2008. The album was produced by David Foster, and co-produced, engineered and mixed by Jochem van der Saag. It is made up of cover versions of eleven soul music classics.

The album charted within the top 10 in twelve countries. In the United Kingdom, the album charted at number twelve. As of January 2012, the album had sold 419,841 copies in the UK. The album peaked at number thirteen in the United States on the Billboard 200 albums chart. It has since sold 547,000 copies in the US.

Track listing

Personnel
Seal – vocals, backing vocals
Dean Parks, Michael Thompson – guitar
Marcus Brown, Nathan East – bass guitar
David Foster – piano, string and horn arrangements
Jochem Van Der Saag – Hammond organ, synthesizer, programming
Teddy Campbell – drums on "Knock on Wood"
John Robinson – drums on "Stand by Me"
Jerry Hey – string and horn arrangements
Don Sebesky – string and horn arrangement on "It's a Man's Man's Man's World" and "Knock on Wood"
Brad Dechter – string and horn arrangement on "I'm Still in Love with You"

Charts

Weekly charts

Year-end charts

Certifications

References

External links

Seal (musician) albums
2008 albums
Covers albums
Albums arranged by Don Sebesky
Albums produced by David Foster
Warner Records albums
143 Records albums